The Sermon is an album of spirituals by American jazz pianist Hampton Hawes recorded in 1958, but not released on the Contemporary label until 1987.

Reception
The Allmusic review by Scott Yanow called said the album was "full of intense emotion, strong melodies and a little more variety than one might expect" and stated "This set was pianist Hampton Hawes' last before he started what would be five years in prison on drug charges. He had been arrested 11 days before and ironically chose to record a set of spirituals (plus a blues) as he awaited trial".

Track listing
All compositions are traditional except as indicated

 "Down by the Riverside" – 4:43
 "Just a Closer Walk with Thee" – 5:00
 "Swing Low, Sweet Chariot" – 4:52
 "Nobody Knows the Trouble I've Seen" – 4:52
 "When The Roll Is Called Up Yonder" – 4:31
 "Go Down Moses" – 4:33
 "Joshua Fit de Battle of Jericho" – 3:54
 "Blues N/C" (Hampton Hawes) - 8:49

Personnel 
 Hampton Hawes – piano
 Leroy Vinnegar – bass
 Stan Levey – drums

References 

Contemporary Records albums
Hampton Hawes albums
1987 albums